Llama Farmers were a musical group formed in Greenwich, England in 1997.

The band's line-up consisted of singer/guitarist Bernie Simpson, guitarist William Briggs, bassist Jennie Simpson and drummer Brooke Rogers. They released their first singles through the Fierce Panda label and their albums – Dead Letter Chorus in 1999 (with the singles 'Get The Keys And Go', 'Jessica' and 'Always Echoes' and El Toppo (with the singles 'Snow White' and 'Same Song') in 2001 – through Beggars Banquet Records. Their musical style has been described as a mix of Britpop and grunge.

Llama Farmers played the NME Premier Tour in 1999, and opened for Green Day and Foo Fighters. In 1998, they appeared at the Reading Festival.

The band reformed under the name Bear Hug in 2006, but they reportedly had no plans to record new songs or be known as 'Llama Farmers' again. In a 2013 interview, Simpson said that the respective members of Bear Hug eventually drifted apart and that he had begun recording with a new outfit, Pronk, whose work was set to be produced by Ethan Johns. Since then, Llama Farmers Simpson has also been reported to be involved in various other outfits, such as Vizzini and Archipelago.

References

External links
 Llama Farmers on MTV.com

English alternative rock groups
Musical groups established in 1997